Pilot crater is an impact crater in the Northwest Territories, Canada, just north of the Alberta border and near Fort Smith .

Lake trout, northern pike, whitefish, and pickerel are plentiful, supporting a summer market for recreational fishing.

References

External links
Aerial Exploration of the Pilot impact structure

Impact craters of the Northwest Territories
Lakes of the Northwest Territories
Ordovician impact craters
Ordovician Northwest Territories
Impact crater lakes